The Brood is the seventh studio album by Dutch rock and roll and blues group Herman Brood & His Wild Romance. The album reached #22 on the Dutch album chart on 16 June 1984, and stayed on the chart for 17 weeks.

Track listing

Personnel
Herman Brood - piano, keyboards, vocals
Jean Blaute - synthesizer
Bertus Borgers - saxophone
Gee Carlsberg - bass
Michael Dawe - drums
David Hollestelle - guitar, keyboards, vocals
Lies Schilp - vocals
Robbie Schmitz - vocals
Ad van der Ree  - drums
Evert Verhees - bass
Henny Vrienten - vocals on "No Ballad"
Jan Hollestelle - Bass on "No ballad"
Joost Belinfante - Mouth harp on "No ballad"

References 

1984 albums
Herman Brood & His Wild Romance albums